The Passion of the Christ is the soundtrack, on the Sony label, of the 2004 Academy Award-nominated film The Passion of the Christ starring James Caviezel, Maia Morgenstern, Christo Jivkov, Hristo Shopov, Francesco De Vito and Monica Bellucci. The original score was composed by John Debney.

The album was nominated for the Academy Award for Best Original Score. Mel Gibson, the director for The Passion of the Christ, is believed to have sung in part of the soundtrack.

Track listing
"The Olive Garden"
"Bearing the Cross"
"Jesus Arrested"
"Peter Denies Jesus"
"The Stoning"
"Song of Complaint"
"Simon Is Dismissed"
"Flagellation / Dark Choir / Disciples"
"Mary Goes to Jesus"
"Peaceful But Primitive / Procession"
"Crucifixion"
"Raising the Cross"
"It Is Done"
"Jesus Is Carried Down"
"Resurrection"

Awards

On 2005, the album won a Dove Award for Instrumental Album of the Year at the 36th GMA Dove Awards.

The album was also nominated for the Academy Award for Best Original Score at the 77th Academy Awards (2004).

Certifications

References

John Debney soundtracks
2004 soundtrack albums
The Passion of the Christ
Drama film soundtracks